Akola Junction (station code:- AK) serves Akola in Akola district in the Indian state of Maharashtra. It is an important junction station on the Howrah–Nagpur–Mumbai line. There is a  broad gauge line to Secunderabad railway station and the metre-gauge Akola–Khandwa line is under gauge conversion.

History
The first train in India travelled from Mumbai to Thane on 16 April 1853. By May 1854, Great Indian Peninsula Railway's Bombay–Thane line was extended to Kalyan.  Bhusawal railway station was set up in 1860 and in 1867 the GIPR branch line was extended to Nagpur. On Google map, address of the railway station is shown as "Panchashil Nagar, Jafrabad", while it is closest and located at Ramdaspeth (in old times popularly known as "Chandmari".)

Electrification
The railways in the Bhusawal area were electrified in 1989–90.

Gauge conversion
There earlier existed a -long metre-gauge line from Jaipur to Secunderabad via Akola. Out of this Jaipur to Indore and the Secunderabad–Purna–Akola sections have already been converted to  broad gauge and in 2021 was electrified to Purna junction. Conversion of the Ratlam–Akola section was approved for conversion in 2008 work until Mhow has been completed and conversion of Mhow–Khandwa already began. Akola- Akot conversion of broad gauge is completed but trains on this route are yet to be started. There are three stages of work on Akola Khandwa line. Presently the Khandawa Akot section is incomplete because there are many forest and animal issues. This route goes from Melghat Tiger Reserve, so there are many issues about the safety of animals.

Traffic
Akola railway station is amongst the top hundred booking stations of Indian Railway. 138 trains (including weeklies and bi-weeklies) pass through Akola railway station.

Gallery

References

Railway stations in Akola district
Railway junction stations in Maharashtra
Railway stations opened in 1867
1867 establishments in India